In Greek mythology, Atlas (Átlas) is a Titan condemned to hold up the  heavens or sky for eternity after the Titanomachy. Atlas also plays a role in the myths of two of the greatest Greek heroes: Heracles (Hercules in Roman mythology) and Perseus. According to the ancient Greek poet Hesiod, Atlas stood at the ends of the earth in extreme west. Atlas was said to have been skilled in philosophy, mathematics, and astronomy. In antiquity, he was credited with inventing the first celestial sphere. In some texts, he is even credited with the invention of astronomy itself.

Atlas was the son of the Titan Iapetus and the Oceanid Asia or Clymene. He was a brother of Epimetheus and Prometheus. He had many children, mostly daughters, the Hesperides, the Hyades, the Pleiades, and the nymph Calypso who lived on the island Ogygia.

The term Atlas has been used to describe a collection of maps since the 16th century when Flemish geographer Gerardus Mercator published his work in honour of the mythological Titan.

The "Atlantic Ocean" is derived from "Sea of Atlas". The name of Atlantis mentioned in Plato's Timaeus' dialogue derives from "Atlantis nesos", literally meaning "Atlas's Island".

Etymology
The etymology of the name Atlas is uncertain. Virgil took pleasure in translating etymologies of Greek names by combining them with adjectives that explained them: for Atlas his adjective is durus, "hard, enduring", which suggested to George Doig that Virgil was aware of the Greek τλῆναι "to endure"; Doig offers the further possibility that Virgil was aware of Strabo's remark that the native North African name for this mountain was Douris. Since the Atlas mountains rise in the region inhabited by Berbers, it has been suggested that the name might be taken from one of the Berber languages, specifically from the word ádrār "mountain".

Traditionally historical linguists etymologize the Ancient Greek word Ἄτλας (genitive: Ἄτλαντος) as comprised from copulative α- and the Proto-Indo-European root  'to uphold, support' (whence also τλῆναι), and which was later reshaped to an nt-stem. However, Robert S. P. Beekes argues that it cannot be expected that this ancient Titan carries an Indo-European name, and he suggests instead that the word is of Pre-Greek origin, as such words often end in -ant.

Mythology

War and punishment

Atlas and his brother Menoetius sided with the Titans in their war against the Olympians, the Titanomachy. When the Titans were defeated, many of them (including Menoetius) were confined to Tartarus, but Zeus condemned Atlas to stand at the western edge of the earth and hold up the sky on his shoulders. Atlas did not want to do this resulting in him being sent to hell. Thus, he was Atlas Telamon, "enduring Atlas," and became a doublet of Coeus, the embodiment of the celestial axis around which the heavens revolve.

A common misconception today is that Atlas was forced to hold the Earth on his shoulders, but Classical art shows Atlas holding the celestial spheres, not the terrestrial globe; the solidity of the marble globe borne by the renowned Farnese Atlas may have aided the conflation, reinforced in the 16th century by the developing usage of atlas to describe a corpus of terrestrial maps.

Encounter with Perseus

The Greek poet Polyidus c. 398 BC tells a tale of Atlas, then a shepherd, encountering Perseus who turned him to stone. Ovid later gives a more detailed account of the incident, combining it with the myth of Heracles. In this account Atlas is not a shepherd, but a king. According to Ovid, Perseus arrives in Atlas's Kingdom and asks for shelter, declaring he is a son of Zeus. Atlas, fearful of a prophecy that warned of a son of Zeus stealing his golden apples from his orchard, refuses Perseus hospitality. In this account, Atlas is turned not just into stone by Perseus, but an entire mountain range: Atlas's head the peak, his shoulders ridges and his hair woods. The prophecy did not relate to Perseus stealing the golden apples but to Heracles, another son of Zeus, and Perseus's great-grandson.

Encounter with Heracles

One of the Twelve Labours of the hero Heracles was to fetch some of the golden apples that grow in Hera's garden, tended by Atlas's reputed daughters, the Hesperides (which were also called the Atlantides), and guarded by the dragon Ladon. Heracles went to Atlas and offered to hold up the heavens while Atlas got the apples from his daughters.

Upon his return with the apples, however, Atlas attempted to trick Heracles into carrying the sky permanently by offering to deliver the apples himself, as anyone who purposely took the burden must carry it forever, or until someone else took it away. Heracles, suspecting Atlas did not intend to return, pretended to agree to Atlas's offer, asking only that Atlas take the sky again for a few minutes so Heracles could rearrange his cloak as padding on his shoulders. When Atlas set down the apples and took the heavens upon his shoulders again, Heracles took the apples and ran away.

In some versions, Heracles instead built the two great Pillars of Hercules to hold the sky away from the earth, liberating Atlas much as he liberated Prometheus.

Other Variations

King of Atlantis
According to Plato, the first king of Atlantis was also named Atlas, but that Atlas was a son of Poseidon and the mortal woman Cleito. The works of Eusebius and Diodorus also give an Atlantean account of Atlas. In these accounts, Atlas' father was Uranus and his mother was Gaia. His grandfather was Elium "King of Phoenicia" who lived in Byblos with his wife Beruth. Atlas was raised by his sister, Basilia.

King of Mauretania
Atlas was also a legendary king of Mauretania, the land of the Mauri in antiquity roughly corresponding with modern Northern Morocco and western Algeria. In the 16th century, Gerardus Mercator put together the first collection of maps to be called an "Atlas" and devoted his book to the "King of Mauretania".

Atlas became associated with Northwest Africa over time. He had been connected with the Hesperides, or "Nymphs", which guarded the golden apples, and Gorgons both of which were said to live beyond Ocean in the extreme west of the world since Hesiod's Theogony. Diodorus and Palaephatus mention that the Gorgons lived in the Gorgades, islands in the Aethiopian Sea. The main island was called Cerna, and modern-day arguments have been advanced that these islands may correspond to Cape Verde due to Phoenician exploration. The Northwest Africa region emerged as the canonical home of the King via separate sources. In particular, according to Ovid, after Perseus turns Atlas into a mountain range, he flies over Aethiopia, the blood of Medusa's head giving rise to Libyan snakes. By the time of the Roman Empire, the habit of associating Atlas's home to a chain of mountains, the Atlas Mountains, which were near Mauretania and Numidia, was firmly entrenched.

Other

The identifying name Aril is inscribed on two 5th-century BC Etruscan bronze items: a mirror from Vulci and a ring from an unknown site. Both objects depict the encounter with Atlas of Hercle—the Etruscan Heracles—identified by the inscription; they represent rare instances where a figure from Greek mythology was imported into Etruscan mythology, but the name was not. The Etruscan name Aril is etymologically independent.

Genealogy
Sources describe Atlas as the father, by different goddesses, of numerous children, mostly daughters. Some of these are assigned conflicting or overlapping identities or parentage in different sources. 
By Hesperis:
the Hesperides
By Pleione (or Aethra):
the Hyades
a son, Hyas
the Pleiades
By one or more unspecified goddesses:
Calypso
Dione
Maera

According to Hyginus, in his Fabulae, Atlas is the son of Aether and Gaia.

Cultural influence

Atlas' best-known cultural association is in cartography. The first publisher to associate the Titan Atlas with a group of maps was the print-seller Antonio Lafreri, on the engraved title-page he applied to his ad hoc assemblages of maps, Tavole Moderne Di Geografia De La Maggior Parte Del Mondo Di Diversi Autori (1572); however, he did not use the word "Atlas" in the title of his work, an innovation of Gerardus Mercator, who dedicated his "atlas" specifically to honour the Titan, Atlas, King of Mauretania, a learned philosopher, mathematician, and astronomer. In psychology, Atlas is used metaphorically to describe the personality of someone whose childhood was characterized by excessive responsibilities. Ayn Rand's political dystopian novel Atlas Shrugged (1957) references the popular misconception of Atlas holding up the entire world on his back by comparing the capitalist and intellectual class as being "modern Atlases" which hold the modern world up at great expense to themselves.

Gallery

Genealogy

See also

Notes

References

 
 Apollodorus, Apollodorus, The Library, with an English Translation by Sir James George Frazer, F.B.A., F.R.S. in 2 Volumes. Cambridge, Massachusetts, Harvard University Press; London, William Heinemann Ltd. 1921. Online version at the Perseus Digital Library.
 
 
 
 Hesiod, Theogony, in The Homeric Hymns and Homerica with an English Translation by Hugh G. Evelyn-White, Cambridge, Massachusetts., Harvard University Press; London, William Heinemann Ltd. 1914. Online version at the Perseus Digital Library.
 Hesiod; Works and Days, in The Homeric Hymns and Homerica with an English Translation by Hugh G. Evelyn-White, Cambridge, Massachusetts., Harvard University Press; London, William Heinemann Ltd. 1914. Online version at the Perseus Digital Library.
 
 Hyginus, Gaius Julius, De Astronomica, in The Myths of Hyginus, edited and translated by Mary A. Grant, Lawrence: University of Kansas Press, 1960. Online version at ToposText.
 Hyginus, Gaius Julius, Fabulae, in The Myths of Hyginus, edited and translated by Mary A. Grant, Lawrence: University of Kansas Press, 1960. Online version at ToposText.
 
 
 
 
 
 
Smith, William; Dictionary of Greek and Roman Biography and Mythology, London (1873). "Atlas"

External links

 Warburg Institute Iconographic Database (c. 140 images of Atlas)

 
Greek gods
Mythology of Heracles
Titans (mythology)
Kings of Mauretania
Kings in Berber mythology
Deeds of Zeus
Metamorphoses characters
Atlanteans
Metamorphoses into terrain in Greek mythology